The French Frigate Shoals (Hawaiian: Kānemilohai) is the largest atoll in the Northwestern Hawaiian Islands. Its name commemorates French explorer Jean-François de La Pérouse, who nearly lost two frigates when attempting to navigate the shoals. It consists of a  crescent-shaped reef, twelve sandbars, and the  La Perouse Pinnacle, the only remnant of its volcanic origins. It is maintained as a field station in the Hawaiian Islands National Wildlife Refuge by the United States Fish and Wildlife Service.

In the 20th century, the shoals were used by the Imperial Japanese Navy as part of an operation to attack Hawaii; afterwards, a small United States Navy base was established there to prevent it from being used again. After the war it was used by the United States Coast Guard for a LORAN radio navigation station. By the 21st century, it was primarily used for oceanographic and biological study as a nature reserve. Studies at the island helped establish the nature of plastic pollution, and in 2020 one island was designated as contaminated by plastic pollution from the ocean. The reefs are noted for having survived many Pacific storms, although these storms have damaged facilities, wildlife, and significantly reduced the area of some islands.

History

Although there is no evidence of extensive human activity or presence in the area, the earliest human visitors to the French Frigate Shoals probably came from the main Hawaiian Islands, which were settled by Polynesians between 1100 and 1300 AD.

The Hawaiian island chain lay outside the routes followed by early European explorers, and it was not until Jean-François de La Pérouse's near-disastrous discovery that the shoals were known to the outside world. La Pérouse, aboard the frigate Boussole, was sailing westward from Monterey en route to Macau. During the night of 6 November 1786, sailors sighted breakers directly in their path, about a thousand feet ahead. Both the Boussole and her companion vessel, the frigate Astrolabe, were immediately brought about, passing within a few hundred feet of the breakers. At daybreak, the ships returned and mapped the southeastern half of the atoll, as well as finding the rock that would later be named after La Pérouse. La Pérouse named the shoals Basse des Frégates Françaises, the "Shoal of the French Frigates".

The expedition went on to discover the nearby Necker Island. His ships were L'Astrolabe (under command of Fleuriot de Langle) and the La Boussole. La Perouse was on a mission of exploration from the French Academy of Sciences, and they made many discoveries in across the Pacific. The expedition was lost at sea in 1788 while still on the expedition, but was able to send its logs home.

In 1823, the whaling ship Two Brothers sank near Shark island. This wreck was discovered in the early 21st century.

In 1841 the French Frigate Shoals were visited by the United States Exploring Expedition authorized by President Andrew Jackson. The shoals were visited by the sailing ships, brigs Oregon and Porpoise.

In 1859 the barque Gambia (a) and clipper Modern Times visited the French Frigate Shoals. That same year the whaler South Seaman wrecked on the shoals. About a dozen of its crew were rescued by another vessel in the area, but about 30 were left on the island until another ship could retrieve them. In December 1859 the brig Wanderer was also lost on the shoals, but the crew was rescued.

During the late 19th century American and European companies became interested in the possibility of mining guano in the Hawaiian Islands. U.S. Navy Lieutenant John M. Brooke, sailing on the naval schooner , formally took possession of French Frigate Shoals for the United States on 14 January 1859, in accordance with the Guano Islands Act. In 1894, French Frigate Shoals, Kure Atoll, Midway Atoll, and Pearl and Hermes Reef were leased for 25 years by the Republic of Hawaii to the North Pacific Phosphate and Fertilizer Company; however, guano and phosphate deposits at French Frigate Shoals were found to be impractical to mine. The Republic did not formally claim possession of the shoals until 13 July 1895.

French Frigate Shoals was included among the lands and waters acquired by the United States on 7 July 1898, when Hawaii became a United States territory. In 1909 it was made a part of the Hawaiian Islands Bird Reservation.

In 1896 the seal hunting ship Mattie E. Dyer wrecked on the shoals, and the crew abandoned ship in whaleboats. There was no water on the island they landed on among the shoals so they sailed the boats to Hawaii.

Early 20th century
In 1902 the Albatross expedition visited the French Frigate Shoals and studied the birds. Several naturalists visited and published an ornithological report.

In 1903 the ship Connétable de Richemont wrecked on the shoals, but its crew escaped on boats to mainland Hawaii.

In 1909 the French Frigate Shoals became part of the Hawaiian Island Reservation and administered by the United States Department of Agriculture.

In 1917 the four-mast schooner Churchill wrecked on the French Frigate Shoals. The crew of 12 survived.

The Tanager Expedition visited the French Frigate Shoals in 1923 and did a survey of the islands.

The United States Revenue Cutter Service sent many patrols to this region in the early 20th century. The U.S. Revenue Cutter Service vessel USRC Thetis visited the French Frigate Shoals in 1912, 1914, 1915, and 1916. In 1918 the shoals were inspected by the USS Hermes. Shoal inspections in the 1920s and 1930s include ones by the USS Pelican in 1924, the USRC Itasca in 1931 and 1934, and the USCGC Reliance in 1936.

In 1932, the minesweeper USS Quail visited the shoals, anchoring near East Island. A seaplane tendered from the ship took some of the first aerial photographs of the islands.

In 1936, the seaplane tender USS Wright (AV-1) came to the shoals, and established a base on East island to support a month of seaplane operations.

In 1937, a member of a USN seaplane crew died at the French Frigate Shoals while his PK-1 seaplane was moored there.

World War II

In March 1942, Imperial Japanese Navy planners took advantage of the shoal's isolation to use its protected waters as an anchorage and refueling point for the long-range flying boats employed in Operation K, a reconnaissance operation that aimed to disrupt salvage and repair operations following the attack on Pearl Harbor. The operation involved three IJN submarines and two Kawanishi H8K flying boats. The H8K flying boats stopped to refuel in the shoals from two of the submarines, I-15 and I-19. After the operation, United States Pacific Fleet Commander Chester W. Nimitz ordered a permanent United States Navy presence at the shoals.

Some U.S. Navy ships that were stationed at the Shoals in 1942 were the seaplane tender USS Thornton (AVD-11)  and the mine warfare ship USS Preble (DM-20). Over twenty flying boats were operated from the French Frigate Shoals during WWII, typically flying reconnaissance missions.

The station's main function was as an emergency landing site for planes flying between Hawaii and Midway Atoll. French Frigate Shoals Airport comprises what remains of the original naval air station.

The ship YHB-10 arrived at French Frigate Shoals in August 1942, carrying staff to help establish the naval base there. It was moored on the north side of Tern island and used as a floating barracks. On March 26, 1945 it was sunk as a torpedo practice target near the shoals.

United States Coast Guard station 
The United States Coast Guard operated a LORAN navigation station on East Island until 1952, and Tern Island until 1979. At any one time, 15 to 20 military personnel were billeted to French Frigate Shoals. As with all Coast Guard isolated duty stations, the Service attempted to fill open billets with volunteers. If there were no volunteers for essential billets, the Coast Guard would at times fill open slots as a disciplinary measure.

The LORAN station commanding officer was typically a lieutenant junior grade officer, the executive officer a chief petty officer enlisted rank. The station was staffed with USCG enlisted specialists such as Radioman, Electronic Technician, Fireman, Boatswain's Mates, plus seaman or seaman apprentice nonrated service members (assigned to perform maintenance and other generalized duties).

The Coast Guard designated the French Frigate Shoals billet as "isolated duty," thereby entitling Coast Guard members serving at the station to additional monthly "isolated duty pay." Because of the billet's remoteness, a duty term was limited to one year.

In December 1969, a tsunami devastated the islands, forcing the crew on Tern Island to evacuate the station, which was destroyed. The station was off the air from 1 to 6 December.

Whale-Skate Island washed away in the 1990s.

21st century

A United States Fish and Wildlife Service field station was active at the island from 1979 to 2012. In 2000, the atoll became part of the Northwestern Hawaiian Islands Coral Reef Ecosystem Reserve, which was incorporated into the Northwestern Hawaiian Islands National Monument in 2006. In 2009 the islands were evacuated during the approach of Hurricane Neki by landing a USCG C-130 on Tern's coral airstrip.

In 2005, a wreck was found possibly the wreck of the schooner Churchill which ran aground at the French Frigate Shoals in 1917. Maritime archeologists returned in 2007 and 2008 to try and identify the wreck site, which included items like anchors and equipment.

In 2008 a shipwreck of a 19th century whaling ship was found near Shark island. The wreck was identified in 2011 as the whaling sailing ship Two Brothers. The ship wrecked the night of February 11, 1823 under the command of Captain George Pollard Jr. (of Essex fame). The crew was able to be rescued by another whaling ship they were on the voyage with, Martha. Captain Pollard is noted for inspiring the novel Moby Dick when his sailing ship the Essex was rammed by a whale. The discovery was important maritime archeology find for various reasons; there is only one surviving whaling ship from this period, and the wreck of the Two Brothers had been lost for nearly two centuries. The finding of the Two Brothers was the first discovery of a wrecked Nantucket whaling ship.

At least five other vessels are recorded to have wrecked on the French Frigate Shoals between 1859 to 1917.

In December 2012, 5 people were evacuated from the FFS in advance of a severe storm. They departed by boat from Tern island and travelled back to Honolulu. The storm caused damage to some of the facilities on the island including the barracks. 
The US Fish & Wildlife service closed its field station on Tern island at the end of 2012.

In 2016, a National Oceanic and Atmospheric Administration ship conducted a 33 day survey expedition of the French Frigate Shoals, including reporting on the condition of the reefs.

In October 2018, Hurricane Walaka eroded away most of East Island, the second largest island of the French Frigate Shoals. About 11 acres of East Island were eliminated, which was thought to be caused by the large storm surge that Walaka caused in the area. The hurricane damaged many of the shoal's islands, and underwater many coral reefs were stripped of sea life.

In 2020, the Papahanaumokuakea Marine Debris Project, working in conjunction with government agencies, removed tens of thousands of pounds of debris from the region.

Geology and ecology

La Perouse Pinnacle, a rock outcrop in the center of the atoll, is the oldest and most remote volcanic rock in the Hawaiian chain. Because of its shape, the pinnacle is often mistaken for a ship from a distance.

Whale-Skate Island is a submerged island in the French Frigate Shoals. These islands suffered considerably from erosion starting in the 1960s, and by the late 1990s, Whale-Skate Island was completely washed over.

The reef system at French Frigate Shoals supports 41 species of stony corals, including several species that are not found in the main Hawaiian Island chain. More than 600 species of marine invertebrates, many of which are endemic, are found there as well.

More than 150 species of algae live among the reefs. Especially diverse algal communities are found immediately adjacent to La Perouse Pinnacle. This has led to speculation that an influx of additional nutrients – in the form of guano – is responsible for the diversity and productivity of algae in this environment. The reef waters support large numbers of fish. The masked angelfish (Genicanthus personatus), endemic to the Hawaiian Islands, is relatively common there. Most of Hawaii's green sea turtles travel to the shoals to nest. The small islets of French Frigate Shoals provide refuge to the largest surviving population of Hawaiian monk seals, the second most endangered pinniped in the world.

The islands are also an important seabird colony. Eighteen species of seabird, the black-footed albatross, Laysan albatross, Bonin petrel, Bulwer's petrel, wedge-tailed shearwater, Christmas shearwater, Tristram's storm petrel, red-tailed tropicbird, masked booby, red-footed booby, brown booby, great frigatebird, spectacled tern, sooty tern, blue-gray noddy, brown noddy, black noddy and white tern nest on the islands, most of them (16) on Tern Island. Two species, the blue-gray noddy and the brown booby, nest only on La Perouse Pinnacle. The island also is the wintering ground for several species of shorebird.

A three-week research mission in October 2006 by the NOAA led to the discovery of 100 species never seen in the area before, including many that were new to science. The French Frigate Shoals project was part of the Census of Coral Reef Ecosystems of the Census of Marine Life. In addition to scientific analysis, a National Geographic photographer was also on board. The photographer noted the range of vibrant colors and shapes among the coral life. Jim Maragos, an expert on coral life in this region of ocean estimated they discovered 11 new species of coral.

The shark population and type was studied in 2009, and it was determined that some of the species in the area include galapagos sharks, gray reef sharks, and tiger sharks.

Whale-Skate and Trig islands were noted as monk seal pupping areas before they eroded away.

Coral

Coral species found in the French Frigate Shoals between 1907 and 2006, as reported in a 2011 paper by Brainard et al.:
 
Coral unidentified, sp.18
L. incrustans
P. eydouxi
Acropora cerealis
L. sp.22 cf. incrustans
P. sp.10 cf. laysanesis
Acropora gemmifera
L. mycetoseroides
P. ligulata
A. humilis
L. cf. ™'papyracea sp19Pocillopora meandrinaA. nasutaL. cf. scabra sp17P. molokensisA. paniculataPavona duerdeniP. sp.32 cf. verrucosaA. sp.1 (prostrate)P. maldivensisP. sp.33 cf. zelliA. sp.28 cf. retusaP. variansP. sp.11 cf. capitataA. validaBalanophyllia sp. (pink)P. sp. 15 (paliform lobes)A. sp.29 (table)Cladopsammia eguchiiPorites brighamiA. sp.30 cf. palmeraeTabastraea coccineaPorites compressaA. sp. 20 (neoplasia/tumor?)Cyphastrea ocellinaP. sp.23 (arthritic fingers)A. sp.26 cf. loripesLeptastrea agassiziP. duerdeniMontipora capitata'''L. bewickensis
P. evermanni
M. flabellate
L. purpurea
P. hawaiiensis
M. patula
L. pruinosa
Porites lobata
M. sp.4 cf. incrassate
L. sp.8 cf. ?
F. hawaiiensis
P. sp.21 cf. lobata
M. sp.7 (foliaceous)
Cycloseris tenuis
P. sp. 16 cf. lutea
M. tuberculosa
C. vaughani
P. sp.27 (columns)
M. sp.24 (irregular)
Diaseris distorta
P. sp.13 cf. solida
M. verrilli
Fungia scutaria
Psammocora nierstraszi
Leptoseris hawaiiensis
Pocillopora damicornis
P. stellate

Islands

 1)  Whale-Skate Island, currently a double island, is also listed in the census documents together as a block, with an area of 32,020 m2. The shares of the islands are estimated 40% and 60%.
 2)  1971 it was reported that Near Island, although recorded on maps, would be submerged at high tide.
 3)  Bare Island can be seen on satellite images but is not listed in the Census Tract. A 1971 publication says Bare Island has an area of 0.1 acres (about 400 m2).
 4)  As of October 2018, East Island has mostly submerged.
 5)  Round and Mullet Islands in census documents found together as a block 1006, together with an area of 5540 m2. The shares are valued according to a report from 1971 (0.4 and 0.5 acres).

The two major islands of the French Frigate shoals were Tern island and East island, and there is also a tall rock pinnacle. Many of the smaller islands have been washed over, and finally in 2018 East island was largely washed away. Tern island is protected by a seawall that originates from when it was expanded in the 1940s to become a Naval Air base.

Islands known to have been notably washed away or reduced by 2018 include Whale-Skate, Trig, and East Island.

Trig Island

Trig Island is located at 23'52'N, 166'15', and is about 10 acres of area of which approximately 6 acres have vegetation. The island is about 1200 feet long and between 200–300 feet wide. However, the island is known to have weathered considerably between the 1930s and 1960s. It was surveyed several times in the 1920s and 1930s. In the early surveys it was noted as the highest of French Frigate Shoals' islands rising to 20 feet above sea level. By 2018 it mostly washed away.

Whale-Skate Island
Whale-Skate Island used to be two separate islands but were combined by a sand bar in the 20th century. Whale-Skate Island was about 2100 feet long and 16.8 acres.

In 1923 they were surveyed as two separate islands, Whale Island and Skate Island. In the 1950s it was noted they had been connected by a sand bar several feet high.

In the 1980s, Whale-Skate Island was about 6.8 ha (16.8 acres), and was noted as a pupping area for seals.

La Perouse Pinnacle 

La Perouse Pinnacle is a volcanic pinnacle approximately 3 miles WSW of East Island, Hawaii. It is the oldest and most remote volcanic rock in the Hawaiian Islands. It is surrounded by coral reefs and a shorter, rocky islet about 5–10 feet (1.5–3 meters) tall. Because of its distinct shape, the pinnacle can be mistaken for a ship from a distance.

It has been called a "volcanic rock islet" and is known for its central position in the French Frigate Shoals between north and south sides of atoll. The pinnacle is visible from a distance of about 8 miles (12.8 km) away at sea.

The rock is named for Comte de La Pérouse, who came across the shoals in 1786.

The Pinnacle is composed mainly of very hard volcanic type rock, and the island is thought to be the remains of a volcano from millions of years ago.

In 1923 on the Tanager expedition it was visited and determined to be olivine basalt rock.

The pinnacle's resemblance to a sailing ship at distance nearly caused the wrecking of the sailing ship Rebecca in the 19th century. The whaling ship Rebecca sighted the pinnacle at nightfall, but mistook it for a sailing ship and tried to signal with it. When the signals were not returned the Rebecca headed towards the ship to investigate, but soon ran into the reef. The ship survived the encounter with shoals, and was able to ascertain the nature of the Pinnacle in the morning.

See also

 List of Guano Island claims
 List of reefs
 List of islands
 Desert island

References

Bibliography

External links

 The French Frigate Shoals Web Page
 Quick Facts on French Frigate Shoals from the PBS Ocean Adventures site

 
Northwestern Hawaiian Islands
Coral reefs of the United States
Atolls of Hawaii
Hawaiian–Emperor seamount chain
Pacific islands claimed under the Guano Islands Act
Reefs of the Pacific Ocean
Reefs of the United States
Seabird colonies
Miocene volcanoes
Paleogene Oceania
Cenozoic Hawaii
Important Bird Areas of Hawaii
Shoals of Oceania